Apologies to the Queen Mary is the 2005 first full-length album by Canadian indie rock band Wolf Parade.

Background 
Songwriting and vocals are split between guitarist Dan Boeckner and keyboardist Spencer Krug.

According to interviews with the band, the album is named after an incident in which the band was removed from the ocean liner Queen Mary for breaking down the door of a ballroom and staging a violent séance.

The song "Dear Sons and Daughters of Hungry Ghosts" refers to Pretas of Buddhist mythology. The "Hungry Ghosts" – beings who, because of actions in their past lives, are always hungry and thirsty, but cannot eat or drink – are used by Krug as a reference to his generation.

The songs "Killing Armies" and "Modern World (Original)" were added to the iTunes Music Store release. Killing Armies is taken from the 2004 EP and Modern World (Original) is from the 2003 EP.

The songs "Fancy Claps", "Same Ghost Every Night", and "This Heart's On Fire" were not originally from an EP. All of the other songs, including "Killing Armies", came from the three previous EPs, except "I'll Believe In Anything". This song appeared on the album Snake's Got a Leg by Sunset Rubdown (another Spencer Krug project), which was recorded in 2004 and released in July 2005.

Krug has stated that "You Are a Runner" is "more about who I am in relation to my family, my father. That song is just about, well, I'm not going to get into great detail, but my father is a certain way, and there are days when it's obvious to me that I could turn out that way, and that's not a way I want to be, and it has a certain effect on the people who are close to him, and then I see the people that are close to me getting affected in the same way. That's it on a basic level, I sort of…I don't want to get into it beyond those vague terms. "Grounds for Divorce" is just about breaking up. The divorce is symbolic, it's not a real divorce."

The music video for "I'll Believe in Anything" was named "Music Video of the Year" at the PLUG Awards.

Reception 

Apologies to the Queen Mary is widely considered one of the most influential indie rock albums of the 2000s. As a result of the rave reception of the album, many music magazines feature Apologies to the Queen Mary in their best of the decade lists. 
The album achieved a score of 83 out of 100 on Metacritic, appeared in the Canadian edition of Time magazine's list of "Canada's Most Anticipated Indie Albums of the Year", and was shortlisted for the 2006 Polaris Music Prize.
Online music magazine Pitchfork placed Apologies to the Queen Mary at number 89 on their list of top 200 albums of the 2000s and placed "I'll Believe in Anything" at 95 on their list of The Top 500 Tracks of the Decade. Cokemachineglow named the record the 5th greatest album of the 2000s. 
LAS Magazine placed it at spot #38 of the greatest records of 2000-2009 while Stylus magazine and PopMatters placed it on spot #19 and #16 on their list of the best albums of 2005, respectively. It was also featured on the list of No Ripcord, taking spot number 12.

As of 2006 it has sold 67,000 copies in United States.

Track listing

Personnel 
 Dan Boeckner – guitar, vocals
 Spencer Krug – piano, keyboards, vocals
 Arlen Thompson – drums
 Hadji Bakara – keyboards, electronics
 Tim Kingsbury – guitar (tracks 4 and 5), bass (track 7)
 Isaac Brock - producer (tracks 1-3, 6, 8-12), 
 Wolf Parade - producers (tracks 4, 5, 7), mixing
 Jace Lasek - mixing (tracks 1-3, 6, 8-12)
 Chris Chandler - engineer
 Jacob Hall - assistant engineer
 Harris Newman - mastering
 Dusty Summers - design
 Matt Moroz - illustrations

References 

2005 debut albums
Wolf Parade albums
Sub Pop albums